The Illinois “Opioids-Covid-19-Naloxone” Resolution is legislation sponsored in the Illinois State Senate. The bill, numbered IL SR 1184, prompts the state of Illinois to examine the rise in opioid overdoses due to the COVID-19 pandemic. The bill also urges the state to improve and increase access to naloxone, an opioid overdose reversal drug.

Background 
In Illinois, almost 80 percent of deaths from drug overdoses involved opioid drugs (drugs such as heroin or the potent fentanyl). This amounted to a total of 2,169 deaths from opioid overdoses. However, deaths from heroin and prescription opioids declined to 1,050 and 539, respectively after 5 years of annual increases.

The global coronavirus (COVID-19) pandemic of 2020 further complicated the crisis. The Illinois stay-at-home order “…created a lack of physical access to addiction support and harm reduction groups during the COVID-19 epidemic,” which increases the risk of overdose death, according to SR 1184.

All this adds to the United States opiate abuse and addiction epidemic that began in the late 1990s due to the over-prescribing of opioid painkillers. From 1999 to 2017, more than 399,000 people died from drug overdoses that involved prescription and illicit opioids.

To stop or reduce this epidemic of mortality from opioid overdose, medical personnel can prescribe naloxone, a medication that quickly reverses an opioid overdose. It is an opioid antagonist, in †hat it reverses and blocks the effects of opioids. Opiate drugs suppress the body's respiratory system, and overdoses are fatal when they stop someone's breathing. Naloxone quickly restores a person to normal respiration.

Legislation 
The bill acknowledges the severity and urgency of the worsening of the opiate crisis during the COVID-19 pandemic. The bill declares several facts. First, Illinois’ stay-at-home order restricts access to addiction support groups and harm reduction groups, which increases the risk of overdose deaths. Second, the social isolation resulting from the stay-at-home order and social distancing policies puts further stress and strain in people suffering from opiate addiction and substance abuse issues. Third, because of the strain that COVID-19 is putting on hospitals and the healthcare system, there is a lack of capacity to deal with opiate addiction and overdose patients. And fourth, co-prescription of naloxone with high doses of opiates has already been approved in nine states, all of which saw a decrease in opiate overdose deaths.

As a result of the facts (as they are stated in the bill), the legislation urges the State of Illinois, through the Illinois Department of Public Health and the Department of Human Services, to examine the increase in opiate overdose deaths within the state and urges those agencies to propose changes to the state's prescription rules that would include co-prescription of naloxone to patients in high-risk groups of overdose.

Legislative action 
The legislation was introduced in the 101st General Assembly session of the Illinois State Senate on May 21, 2020 by State Senator Melinda Bush. It was referred to the Senate Assignments Committee.

In 2015, Bush sponsored related legislation that would allow licensed and trained pharmacists to prescribe anti-overdose drugs to family members of people at risk of overdose. The bill was nicknamed “Lali’s Law” after Alex “Lali” Laliberte died from an overdose.

See also 

 California Naloxone Requirement Bill
 Colorado Harm Reduction Substance Use Disorders Law
 New Jersey Opioid Antidote Prescription Bill
 New York Mandatory Opioid Antagonist Prescription Bill
 South Carolina Opioid Overdose Prevention Bill

References

External links

 “Coprescribing mandates seem to increase naloxone dispensing”
 “HHS recommends prescribing or co-prescribing naloxone to patients at high risk for an opioid overdose”

United States state health legislation